Flares (foaled 1933 in Maryland) was an American-bred, British-trained Thoroughbred racehorse owned, bred, and raced by the preeminent horseman in the United States, William Woodward, Sr. Flares was out of the racemare Flambino, winner of the 1927 Gazelle Stakes. His sire was the great Gallant Fox, the 1930 U.S. Triple Crown winner and a U.S. Racing Hall of Fame inductee.

Flares was a full brother to Woodward's 1935 U.S. Triple Crown champion, Omaha. Determined to win England's most prestigious weight-for-age race, the Ascot Gold Cup, in 1936 Woodward sent the then four-year-old Omaha to compete in England, where he ran second in the Ascot Gold Cup.

When Flares was a yearling in 1934, Woodward shipped him to trainer Cecil Boyd-Rochfort at his base in Newmarket, England. Racing at age three, in mid-May 1936 Flares won the Newmarket Stakes. In 1937, he had an outstanding year as a four-year-old. At Newmarket Racecourse, he won the mile and a half Princess of Wales's Stakes, the Champion Stakes at a mile and a quarter, and the Lowther Stakes at a mile and three quarters.

In 1938, Flares was entered in the Ascot Gold Cup and was sent off by bettors as a 100 to 7 longshot. However, he became the first American horse since Foxhall in 1882 to win the prestigious two and a half mile race and gave William Woodward his first-ever victory in the event.

Stud record
Immediately after his Gold Cup win, Flares was brought back to stand at stud in the United States. The October 14, 1938, issue of the Los Angeles Times reported he would stand for a fee of US$1,000. 

Flares sired a number of race winners, including:
 Chop Chop (b. 1940) - won Empire City Handicap. Leading sire in Canada five times. Canadian Horse Racing Hall of Fame inductee.
 Skytracer (b. 1941) - winner of the 1944 Blue Grass Stakes, Kentucky Derby runner
 Epigram (b. 1949) - in 1952, he won Canada's most prestigious race, the Queen's Plate.

Pedigree

References

 Flares' pedigree and partial racing stats

1933 racehorse births
Racehorses bred in Maryland
Racehorses trained in the United Kingdom
Thoroughbred family 17-b